Events in the year 1951 in Nepal.

Incumbents 

 Monarch: Tribhuvan
 Prime Minister: Mohan Shumsher Jung Bahadur Rana (1948-12 November 1951) and Matrika Prasad Koirala (16 November)

Events 

 November – 1951 Nepalese revolution begins.
 10 November  – King Tribhuvan and his family go to New Delhi.

Births 

 18 February – Komal Rajya Lakshmi Devi Shah
 27 June – Madan Bhandari

Deaths

References 

 
1950s in Nepal
Nepal
Nepal
Years of the 20th century in Nepal